Blum is a German surname and Ashkenazi surname, Yiddish Blum means 'flower'. This is a completely different surname to Blume and is pronounced differently too. Notable people with the name include:

 Abraham Blum (1905 – 1943), Polish-Jewish activist
 Alex Blum (1889 – 1969), comic book artist
Alice Blum (more commonly known by married name Alice Mavrogordato; 1916–2000) Austrian-born American artist, and translator.
 Brad Blum (born 1953), CEO of Burger King from 2002 until 2004
 Dorothy Blum (1924 – 1980), computer scientist and cryptographer
 Edward Blum (disambiguation), several people
 Geoff Blum (born 1973), baseball player
 George Blum (1870 – 1928), architect
 H Steven Blum (born 1946), US lieutenant general (National Guard)
 Heather Munroe-Blum (born 1950), principal of McGill University, Montréal
 Heinrich Blum (1884 – 1942), Czechoslovakian architect
 Jason Blum (born 1969), American film producer
 John Morton Blum (1921 – 2011), writer of political history
 Jonathon Blum (born 1989), American ice hockey player
 Kevin Blum, neutralized train shooter in 1993_Long_Island_Rail_Road_shooting
 Lawrence Blum (born 1943), American philosopher and professor
 Lenore Blum (born 1942), American mathematician and computer scientist
 Léon Blum (1872 – 1950), socialist Prime Minister of France from 1936 to 1937
 Mark Blum (1950–2020), American actor
 Marty Blum, mayor of Santa Barbara, California (2001 to present)
 Manuel Blum (born 1938), computer scientist
 Paul Blum (1898 – 1981), American intelligence officer
 René Blum (ballet) (1878 – 1942), French founder of Ballet de l'Opera a Monte Carlo
 René Blum (politician) (1889 – 1967), Luxembourgian politician
 Richard C. Blum (1935–2022), investment banker, husband of US Senator Dianne Feinstein
 Robert Blum (1807–1848), Saxon/German member of parliament in 1848
 Robert Blum (fencer) (1928–2022), American Olympic fencer
 Robert Frederick Blum (1857 – 1903), American artist 
 Rod Blum (born 1955), American politician 
 Samuel E. Blum (1920–2013), American chemist and physicist
 Sammy Blum (1889 – 1945), American actor
Shirley Neilsen Blum (born 1932), American art historian, gallerist, author and professor.
 Steven Blum (born 1960), American voice actor for anime and video games
 Suzanne Blum (born 1978), American chemist
 Suzanne Blum (lawyer) (1898-1994) French lawyer and writer
 William Blum (1933–2018), American author and foreign policy critic

German-language surnames
Ashkenazi surnames
Occupational surnames